Söğütlüçeşme is the eastern terminus of the Istanbul Metrobus Bus rapid transit line. It is located along Ziverbey Road, just west of the Istanbull Inner Beltway, adjacent to the Söğütlüçeşme railway station. Connection to Marmaray commuter rail service as well as high-speed, intercity and regional rail will be available towards the end of 2018.

Söğütlüçeşme station was opened on 3 March 2009 as part of the eastward expansion of the line across the Bosporus.

References

External links
Zincirlikuyu station

Istanbul Metrobus stations
2009 establishments in Turkey
Transport in Kadıköy